Lampfish is a common name for several fishes and may refer to:

Dinoperca petersi
Lampanyctus parvicauda
Myctophum nitidulum

See also
 Lanternfish
 Anglerfish
, dogtooth lampfish

Fish common names